Ryan Lyle Kohlmeier (born June 25, 1977 in Salina, Kansas) is a former Major League Baseball pitcher who played for the Baltimore Orioles in 2000 and 2001.

Career
He was originally drafted by the Colorado Rockies in the 34th round of the 1995 amateur draft, but did not sign. Kohlmeier was then drafted by the Orioles in the 14th round of the 1996 amateur draft and signed with the team on August 16. He was claimed off waivers by the Chicago White Sox on November 19, 2001. He played in the White Sox' minor league system from 2002 to 2004 and announced his retirement from baseball on August 12, 2004.

Personal life
Kohlmeier graduated from Emporia State University with degrees in biochemistry and molecular biology and the University of Missouri–Kansas City School of Dentistry. , Kohlmeier was a practicing Baptist and dentist in Emporia, Kansas with a wife and three children.

References

External links

1977 births
Living people
American dentists
Baltimore Orioles players
Baptists from Kansas
Baseball players from Kansas
Bowie Baysox players
Butler Grizzlies baseball players
Charlotte Knights players
Delmarva Shorebirds players
Frederick Keys players
Major League Baseball pitchers
Rochester Red Wings players
Sportspeople from Salina, Kansas
University of Missouri–Kansas City alumni